James Elroy Risch (born May 3, 1943) is an American lawyer and politician serving as the junior United States senator from Idaho since 2009. A member of the Republican Party, he served as lieutenant governor of Idaho under governors Dirk Kempthorne and Butch Otter and as the 31st governor of Idaho from 2006 to 2007.

Raised in Milwaukee, Risch moved to Idaho in the early 1960s. After graduating from the University of Idaho, he received a B.S. degree in forestry in 1965 and earned a J.D. in 1968. Afterward, he taught criminal law at Boise State University, and in 1970 was elected as Ada County prosecuting attorney. In 1974, he was elected to the Idaho Senate, where he represented the 21st legislative district from 1974 to 1988. In 1995, Governor Phil Batt appointed Risch to represent the 18th legislative district; he held the position until 2002.

Risch ran for lieutenant governor of Idaho in 2002, defeating incumbent Jack Riggs in the primary. He served under Governor Dirk Kempthorne from 2003 to 2006. After Kempthorne resigned to become the United States Secretary of the Interior, Risch became the 31st governor of Idaho, a position he held from May 2006 to January 2007. He chose not to run for governor in the 2006 gubernatorial election and instead ran for reelection as lieutenant governor. After winning the nomination, he served under Governor Butch Otter from 2007 to 2009.

Risch ran for the U.S. Senate seat held by the retiring Larry Craig in the 2008 election. He won the election, defeating Democratic nominee Larry LaRocco. Risch was reelected in 2014 and 2020.

Early life and education
Born in Milwaukee, Wisconsin, Risch is the son of Helen B. (née Levi) and Elroy A. Risch, a lineman for Wisconsin Bell. His father is of German descent and his mother is of Irish, Scottish, and English ancestry. Risch attended the University of Wisconsin–Milwaukee from 1961 to 1963 and then transferred to the University of Idaho in Moscow, where he was a member of the Phi Delta Theta fraternity. He obtained a B.S. degree in forestry in 1965, and continued his education at the university's College of Law. He served on the Law Review and the College of Law Advisory Committee before receiving a J.D. degree in 1968.

Risch entered politics in 1970 in Boise at age 27, winning election as Ada County Prosecuting Attorney. While serving in this capacity, he taught undergraduate classes in criminal justice at Boise State College and served as the president of the state's prosecuting attorneys' association. Concurrent with his service in the Idaho Senate, Risch became a millionaire as one of Idaho's most successful trial lawyers.

State politics

Idaho Senate
Risch was first elected to the Idaho Senate from Ada County in 1974. He entered the state senate leadership in 1976, serving as majority leader and later as president pro tempore.

In a dramatic upset, Risch was defeated for reelection in 1988 by Democratic political newcomer and Boise attorney Mike Burkett. As of mid-2006, it remains Idaho's most expensive legislative contest.

In the second political defeat of his career, Risch lost the 1994 primary election for a state Senate seat to Roger Madsen. Risch returned to the state senate in 1995, as an appointee of Governor Phil Batt, who had named Madsen as the director of the Department of Labor, then known as the Department of Employment.

39th lieutenant governor (2003–2006)
In January 2001, Risch had his eye on the lieutenant governor's seat vacated by Butch Otter, who resigned after being elected to Congress, but Governor Dirk Kempthorne appointed state Senator Jack Riggs of Coeur d'Alene to the post instead. The next year, Risch defeated Riggs in the Republican primary and won the general election, spending $360,000 of his own money on the campaign.

31st governor of Idaho (2006–2007)
On May 26, 2006, Risch became governor of Idaho when Kempthorne resigned to become U.S. secretary of the interior. Risch appointed Mark Ricks to serve as his lieutenant governor. Risch served out the remaining seven months of Kempthorne's term, which ended in January 2007.

In August 2006, Risch called a special session of the Idaho Legislature to consider his proposed property tax reform bill, the Property Tax Relief Act of 2006.

41st lieutenant governor (2007–2009)
Risch was expected to enter the 2006 Republican gubernatorial primary to succeed Kempthorne, who was completing his second term at this time of his federal appointment. But Otter had already announced his candidacy for the position in December 2004 and gained a significant head start in campaigning and fundraising. In November 2005, Risch announced his intention to seek election again as lieutenant governor.

Risch was unopposed for the 2006 Republican nomination for lieutenant governor and defeated former Democratic U.S. representative Larry LaRocco in the general election. Risch's term as governor ended in January 2007 and he returned to the role of lieutenant governor. He resigned as lieutenant governor to take his seat in the Senate on January 3, 2009. Otter named state Senator Brad Little of Emmett as Risch's successor.

U.S. Senate

Elections
2008

On August 31, 2007, the Associated Press reported that Governor Otter might appoint Risch to the United States Senate to succeed the embattled Larry Craig. On September 1, the Idaho Statesman reported that Otter's spokesman denied Risch had been selected and that Otter had "made no decision and he is not leaning toward anybody." On October 9, Risch announced that he would run for the Senate seat. In May 2008, Risch was nominated as the Republican candidate for U.S. Senate. In the general election he defeated former Democratic Congressman Larry LaRocco with 58% of the vote.

2014

Risch won the Republican primary with 79.9% of the vote and defeated attorney Nels Mitchell in the general election with 65.3% of the vote.

2020

Risch was unopposed in the 2020 Republican primary. He defeated Democratic nominee Paulette Jordan in the general election with 62% of the vote.

Tenure

2000s
Risch was one of four freshmen Republican senators in the 111th Congress of 2009, with Mike Johanns of Nebraska, George LeMieux of Florida and Scott Brown of Massachusetts. Republican Senator Mike Crapo of Idaho called Risch "results-oriented".

2010s
In 2017, Risch was one of 22 senators to sign a letter to President Donald Trump urging him to withdraw the United States from the Paris Agreement.

On August 11, 2017, in an interview on PBS Newshour, Risch endorsed Trump's threatening North Korea with military destruction in the event that country launched missiles at Guam.

On March 22, 2018, the day before a potential federal government shutdown, Risch threatened to block a government spending bill because it included changing the name of the White Clouds Wilderness protected area to honor a deceased political rival, former Idaho Governor Cecil Andrus. Risch ultimately acquiesced.

In January 2019, Risch joined Marco Rubio, Cory Gardner, and Senate Majority Leader Mitch McConnell in introducing legislation that would impose sanctions on the government of President of Syria Bashar al-Assad and bolster American cooperation with Israel and Jordan.

2020s
On January 21, 2020, during the first day of opening arguments in Trump's Senate impeachment trial, Risch was the first senator to fall asleep. Courtroom sketch artist Art Lien memorialized his nap.

In 2020, while Chairman of the Senate Foreign Relations Committee, Risch decided not to press Secretary of State Mike Pompeo to testify at the annual budget hearing. Pompeo had just successfully sought to have State Department inspector general Steve Linick fired; at the time, Linick had been conducting a watchdog investigation into the Trump administration's decision to sell arms to Saudi Arabia without congressional approval. For his tenure as chair of the Senate Foreign Relations Committee during the 116th Congress, the nonpartisan Lugar Center's Congressional Oversight Hearing Index gave Risch an "F" grade.

Risch was participating in the certification of the 2021 United States Electoral College vote count when Trump supporters stormed the United States Capitol. He called the attack "unpatriotic and un-American in the extreme" and suggested it was spurred by "deep distrust in the integrity and veracity of our elections."

In 2021, Risch blocked the confirmation of Holocaust historian Deborah Lipstadt to the position of special envoy to monitor and combat antisemitism.

Committee assignments
 Committee on Energy and Natural Resources
 Energy Subcommittee on Energy 
 Subcommittee on Public Lands and Forests
 Subcommittee on Water and Power
 Committee on Foreign Relations (Ranking Member)' Subcommittee on Western Hemisphere, Peace Corps and Narcotics Affairs (Ex Officio Member)
 Subcommittee on Near Eastern and South and Central Asian Affairs (Ex Officio)
 Subcommittee on African Affairs (Ex Officio)
 Subcommittee on European Affairs (Ex Officio)
 Committee on Small Business and Entrepreneurship
 Select Committee on Ethics
 Select Committee on Intelligence

Caucuses
Senate Republican Conference

Foreign policy positions
 Saudi Arabia 
In 2019, Risch sought to quell dissent among Republican senators over what they perceived as the Trump administration's weak response to the killing of Saudi journalist and U.S. permanent resident Jamal Khashoggi, and its refusal to send Congress a report on the administration's determination of who killed Khashoggi. He told his fellow Republican senators and Politico that the Trump administration was in compliance with the Magnitsky Act, but the administration had said that it refused to comply with the Act.

 Israel Anti-Boycott Act 
In March 2018, Risch co-sponsored the Israel Anti-Boycott Act (s. 720), which would make it a federal crime for Americans to encourage or participate in boycotts against Israel and Israeli settlements in the West Bank if protesting actions by the Israeli government.

Turkey sanctions

Risch was a co-sponsor of the Promoting American National Security and Preventing the Resurgence of ISIS Act of 2019 (S.2641–116th), which was intended to punish Turkey and protect allies like the Kurds, who had suffered from recent Turkish military operations in Syria, including by resettling them in the U.S. The measure had broad support in Congress, which was concerned about the purchase of the Russian S-400 missile system Turkey was testing.

Ethiopia
On October 18, 2022, Risch criticized the Biden administration for hesitating to impose sanctions on the government of Ethiopia, where many atrocities and war crimes were committed in the Tigray War. He tweeted that Biden "must stop avoiding the use of sanctions in fear of offending and prioritize #humanrights".

Political positions
Risch is considered politically conservative. The American Conservative Union's Center for Legislative Accountability gives him a lifetime conservative score of 91.54. The liberal Americans for Democratic Action gave him an ideology score of zero in 2019.

Abortion
Risch is anti-abortion. He believes that Roe v. Wade was wrongly decided. In 2013, he co-sponsored the Child Interstate Abortion Notification Act, which would have made it illegal for a minor to cross state lines for an abortion. Risch supported the June 2022 overturning of Roe v. Wade and applauded the Supreme Court for recognizing "that states have an interest in protecting life at all stages of development by giving Americans the power to decide this matter at the state-level through their elected representatives."

Guns
The National Rifle Association (NRA) endorsed Risch and gave him an A+ grade for his voting record on gun issues.

In 2013, along with 12 other Republican Senators, Risch threatened to filibuster any bills Democrats introduced that Republicans perceived as a threat to gun rights, including expanded background checks. In an interview with National Public Radio, he said that Americans' right to keep and bear arms includes "a right to purchase one [a gun], to sell one, to trade in one, and you really have to have a robust market if indeed you're going to have a constitutional right." He also said that additional background checks would mean that gun dealers would "have to deal with the federal bureaucracy, which is very, very difficult to deal with."

In response to the Orlando nightclub shooting, Risch and Crapo said the shooting was not a reason to call for gun control legislation.

In 2016, Risch voted against the Feinstein Amendment, which would have blocked the sale of guns to people on the terrorist watch list, and Democrat Chris Murphy's proposal to expand background checks for sales at gun shows and online. Risch voted for both Republican-backed bills, John Cornyn's proposal to create a 72-hour delay for anyone on the terrorist watchlist buying a gun and Charles Grassley and Ted Cruz's proposal to alert authorities if a someone on the list tries to buy a firearm.

Criminal justice
Risch opposed the FIRST STEP Act, a bipartisan criminal justice reform bill. The bill passed 87–12 on December 18, 2018.

Health care
Risch supports repealing and replacing the Affordable Care Act (ACA), also known as Obamacare. He voted against the ACA in 2010.

On May 21, 2020, Risch introduced S. 3829, the Global Health Security and Diplomacy Act, but it did not receive a vote. In opening the confirmation hearings for Secretary Antony Blinken, Risch emphasized it as a legislative and foreign policy priority, given the "catastrophic failure at every level" of global health security infrastructure. The bill's supporters claim it would "improve coordination among the relevant Federal departments and agencies implementing United States foreign assistance for global health security, and more effectively enable partner countries to strengthen and sustain resilient health systems and supply chains with the resources, capacity, and personnel required to prevent, detect, mitigate, and respond to infectious disease threats before they become pandemics, and for other purposes."

2021 storming of the United States Capitol
On May 28, 2021, Risch abstained from voting on the creation of an independent commission to investigate the 2021 United States Capitol attack.

Veteran Affairs
On August 2, 2022, Risch was one of only 11 senators to vote against the Promise to Address Comprehensive Toxics (PACT) Act, a bill to expand VA health care and benefits for veterans exposed to burn pits and other toxic substances.

Personal life
Risch is Roman Catholic.

 Electoral history 
 Idaho State Senate 

 Idaho Lieutenant Governor 

 U.S. Senator 

References

External links

 Senator Jim Risch official U.S. Senate website
 Jim Risch for Senate
 
 
 

 Elections
 National Business Aviation Association: Election 2014, Sen. Jim Risch
 Risch revels in upcoming term as king The Idaho Statesman March 18, 2006
 Risch becomes Idaho's 31st governor The Idaho Statesman'' May 26, 2006

|-

|-

|-

|-

|-

|-

|-

|-

|-

|-

1943 births
21st-century American politicians
American people of German descent
American people of English descent
American people of Scottish descent
American people of Irish descent
American prosecutors
Catholics from Idaho
Republican Party governors of Idaho
Idaho lawyers
Republican Party Idaho state senators
Lieutenant Governors of Idaho
Living people
People from Boise, Idaho
Politicians from Milwaukee
Republican Party United States senators from Idaho
University of Idaho alumni
University of Wisconsin–Milwaukee alumni
University of Idaho College of Law alumni
Chairmen of the Senate Committee on Foreign Relations